Christopher John McCann (born 21 July 1987) is an Irish professional footballer who plays for League One club Burton Albion

Club career

Burnley
McCann was born in Dublin, County Dublin. Brought over to Lancashire from the Irish club Home Farm, McCann progressed through the youth system at Burnley, and made his senior debut in the 2005–06 season, coming onto the pitch as an early substitute in the 4–0 win against Coventry City on 13 August 2005.

McCann scored his first senior goal on the 27 September 2005, in the 3–0 win against Ipswich Town.

He started the 2006–07 season in the first-team squad, but reverted to the substitutes' bench after a few games as he sought to confirm his potential at Championship level. However, injuries saw him pressed into action as an emergency left-back and he took these opportunities – re-establishing himself in the first-team line-up. In 2008–09, McCann was linked with a possible move to a Premier League club. McCann began his debut Barclays Premier League season well, but an unfortunate knee injury and subsequent surgery to his cruciate following the game against Sunderland at Turf Moor in September sidelined the midfielder until December 2009 at the earliest. In his second match back from injury, he picked up a second injury that ruled him out for the rest of the season.

Following Burnley's relegation from the Premier League McCann returned to the team and played in Burnley's first three pre-season friendlies against Bury, Oldham Athletic and the first game of Burnley's tour of Singapore in which McCann was taken off with a knee injury. McCann played no further part in Burnley's pre-season and in the week before the Clarets season opener against Nottingham Forest, news broke that the midfielder was a doubt for this game and would be sent to see a specialist. McCann returned to Championship action while being named captain of Burnley FC by manager Eddie Howe.

Wigan Athletic
On 26 June 2013, McCann agreed to join Wigan Athletic following the expiry of his contract with Burnley at the end of the month. He was reunited with former Burnley manager Owen Coyle.

Atlanta United

On 6 July 2016, it was announced that McCann would join Atlanta United FC for their inaugural season in 2017. He went out on loan between the time of his signing and the beginning of the 2017 MLS season. 
On 9 February 2019, McCann was waived by Atlanta.

Loan to Coventry City
On 2 August 2016, McCann joined Coventry City on loan until the start of the 2017 Major League Soccer campaign.

D.C. United
McCann signed with D.C. United on 12 February 2019.
On 12 June 2019, McCann scored his first goal for D.C. United from a header against the Philadelphia Union in the U.S. Open Cup.
D.C. United and McCann mutually parted ways on 31 July 2019.

Oldham Athletic
McCann signed with Oldham Athletic on 18 October 2019 on a short term deal. He made his Oldham debut the next day 19 October 2019 in a 1-0 defeat against Macclesfield Town.

Shamrock Rovers
In December 2020 McCann signed for the League of Ireland Champions

International career
McCann has represented the Republic of Ireland at under-17, under-18 and under-19 level. He was first called up to the Republic of Ireland U21s for the matches against Montenegro and Bulgaria on 16 and 20 November 2007 for the 2009 European U21 Championship qualifiers. On the wake of his call-up Ireland U21 manager, Don Givens, stated that "Chris has been involved with Ireland at other age levels but this is his first call-up to the Under-21 panel. He is a good player and deserves a chance at this level". He was selected in the squad for the 1–0 defeat to Montenegro in Podgorica. However, he had to withdraw due to an injury. This was unexpected news as he has played the week before against Preston North End after he had missed three games with a groin injury.

McCann was again named on the bench for the second match against Bulgaria but opted out of the squad two hours prior to kick-off claiming it was a waste of his time being there. Don Givens criticised McCann saying, "I can never understand anybody that doesn't want to pull on the green shirt". He also added that this event could hinder McCann's future international career, "Will I pick him again? Would you?". Ireland went on to win the match in Athlone regardless of McCann's actions through a 90th-minute winner from the Watford midfielder John-Joe O'Toole. However, Givens later apologised for his criticism, "I take it back, its nice to see Chris developing into a player of true class". Despite smoothing things over with Givens he was never called up to the under-21s again. Since that event McCann has stated his desire to play for the full national side and hoped that his form for his club side could push him into Giovanni Trappatoni's squad.

Personal
McCann earned his U.S. green card in February 2017. This status also qualifies him as a domestic player for MLS roster purposes.

Career statistics

Honours
Burnley
Football League Championship play-offs: 2008–09
Wigan Athletic
League One: 2015–16
Atlanta United

 MLS Cup: 2018

Shamrock Rovers
 League of Ireland Premier Division (2): 2021, 2022
President of Ireland's Cup: 2022

References

External links

Chris McCann profile at Wigan Athletic F.C.

1987 births
Living people
Association footballers from Dublin (city)
Republic of Ireland association footballers
Republic of Ireland youth international footballers
Association football midfielders
Home Farm F.C. players
Burnley F.C. players
Wigan Athletic F.C. players
Coventry City F.C. players
Atlanta United FC players
D.C. United players
Oldham Athletic A.F.C. players
Shamrock Rovers F.C. players
English Football League players
Premier League players
Major League Soccer players
League of Ireland players
Republic of Ireland expatriate association footballers
Irish expatriate sportspeople in England
Irish expatriate sportspeople in the United States
Expatriate footballers in England
Expatriate soccer players in the United States